Flux is the fourth solo album from Black Crowes guitarist Rich Robinson. It is his first for Eagle Rock Entertainment and features guest appearances by Charlie Starr of Blackberry Smoke and former Hookah Brown bandmate John Hogg.

Production

Robinson said of the recording process of Flux: “I love being in the recording studio. It fuels the desire to create within me. I enjoy watching it unfold. Each development fires another idea and in the end, you have this organically created song that seemingly came out of nowhere. It brings me such joy and peace. It never ceases to amaze me.” 

Robinson further commented on the recording process of Flux, remarking: "On my last record, The Ceaseless Sight, I didn’t have as many songs. I had a few songs and parts of other songs and I wanted to use the studio to finish them. I liked the way it turned out, so for this record I said I’m not going to finish anything. You can have parts of songs and sit on them for a while, but when you’re in the studio you have a finite amount of time and you have to get in and finish them. There’s an urgency and I kind of like that pressure. It forces you to make creative decisions on how this is going to turn out. So that’s how I went in. I love the fact that it’s a very eclectic record and that it draws from all of my influences. It takes you on a journey and that’s what records should do. I look at the record as a whole. What I feel when I hear this record is that I’m in a different place for every song. I get inside this place and then the next song comes and I’m in a different place and I really like that. It’s really interesting to go with the music and where it takes you."

Robinson noted that for tracks "Sleepwalker" and "Ides of Nowhere": "These were great examples of songs transforming from little ideas I originally had. Both just came alive when I had the band with me in the studio. They weren't anything like what I had first envisioned. It was exciting to experience that process."

Robinson spoke of "The Music That Will Lift Me," commenting: "I used the studio to specifically write that song. I had these parts written but it started to unfold once I got to Applehead Studios. I later wrote the lyrics in Nashville and it had really evolved into something special."

Track listing

Credits
"The Upstairs Land":
Rich Robinson: guitars, vocals
Joe Magistro: drums, percussion
Matt Slocum: keyboards
Zak Gabbard: bass

"Shipwreck":
Rich Robinson: guitars, vocals, bass
Joe Magistro: drums, percussion
Matt Slocum: keyboards

"Music That Will Lift Me":
Rich Robinson: guitars, vocals, bass, percussion
Chris Powell: drums
Charlie Starr: guitar
Danny Mitchell: keyboards

"Everything's Alright":
Rich Robinson: guitars, vocals, bass, percussion
Joe Magistro: drums, percussion
Matt Slocum: keyboards
Daniella  Cotton: vocals

"Eclipse the Night":
Rich Robinson: guitars, vocals, bass, percussion
Joe Magistro: drums, percussion
Matt Slocum: keyboards
Marco Benevento: keyboards

"Life":
Rich Robinson: guitars, vocals, bass, percussion
Joe Magistro: drums, percussion
Matt Slocum: keyboards

"Ides of Nowhere":
Rich Robinson: guitars, vocals, bass, percussion
Joe Magistro: drums, percussion
Matt Slocum: keyboards
Marco Benevento: keyboards

"Time to Leave":
Rich Robinson: guitars, vocals, bass, drums, percussion
Marco Benevento: keyboards

"Astral":
Rich Robinson: guitars, vocals, bass, percussion
Joe Magistro: drums, percussion
Matt Slocum: keyboards

"For to Give":
Rich Robinson: guitars, vocals, bass, percussion
Joe Magistro: drums, percussion
Matt Slocum: keyboards
Marco Benevento: keyboards
John Hogg: vocals

"Which Way Your Winds Blows":
Rich Robinson: guitars, vocals, bass, percussion
Joe Magistro: drums, percussion
Matt Slocum: keyboards

"Surrender":
Rich Robinson: guitars, vocals, bass, percussion
Joe Magistro: drums, percussion
Marco Benevento: keyboards

"Sleepwalker":
Rich Robinson: guitars, vocals, bass, percussion
Joe Magistro: drums, percussion
Marco Benevento: keyboards
John Hogg: vocals
Produced by: Rich Robinson
Direction: John McDermott
Engineered by: Chris Bittner
Additional Engineering by: Nelson Hubbard (tracks 3, 6-8, 10, 13)
Mixed by: Chris Bittner and Mike Birnbaum
Mastered by: Chris Athens
Recorded and mixed at Applehead Studios

Charts

References

External links
 www.richrobinson.net

2016 albums
Rich Robinson albums